Schefflera violacea is a species of flowering plant in the family Araliaceae. It is endemic to Colombia and Ecuador.

References

violacea
Flora of Colombia
Flora of Ecuador